Zhongzong is the temple name of several Chinese emperors. It may refer to:

 Emperor Xuan of Han (r. 74–49 BC)
 Emperor Yuan of Jin (r. 317–322)
 Li Shou, ruler of Cheng Han (r. 338–343)
 Murong Sheng, ruler of Later Liang (r. 398–401)
 Emperor Wen of Liu Song, (r. 424–453)
 Emperor Xuan of Western Liang (r. 555–562)
 Emperor Zhongzong of Tang (r. 684 and 705–710)
 Liu Sheng (Southern Han) (r. 943–958), Emperor Zhongzong of Southern Han
 Duan Zhengchun, Zhongzong of Dali (r. 1096–1108)

See also 
 Jungjong (Korean romanization of 中宗)

Temple name disambiguation pages